Christophe Revel (born 25 March 1979 in Dinan, France) is a French former professional footballer who played as a goalkeeper.

Coaching career
Revel ended his playing career at the age of 30, taking the goalkeeping coach position at Rennes. He was released from the position in August 2017. In June 2018, Revel joined FC Lorient in a similar position. He left Lorient at the end of May 2019, when a new manager was appointed.

In 2020, Revel had a short stint as goalkeeper coach of the Moroccan national team under Vahid Halilhodžić. He left the position in June 2020, where he joined Lyon on a one-year contract.

In the summer 2021, Revel joined Lille OSC as a goalkeeper coach.

Honours
Vannes
 Coupe de la Ligue: runner-up 2008–09

References

External links

1979 births
Living people
People from Dinan
Sportspeople from Côtes-d'Armor
French footballers
Association football goalkeepers
Brittany international footballers
Stade Rennais F.C. players
K.S.K. Beveren players
GSI Pontivy players
Vannes OC players
Ligue 1 players
Ligue 2 players
Footballers from Brittany